Hasenbach may refer to:

Hasenbach (Zwiefalter Aach), a river of Baden-Württemberg, Germany, tributary of the Zwiefalter Aach
Zajčje Polje, German Hasenbach, a settlement in southern Slovenia
Hasenbach, a division of Reichshof, a municipality of  North Rhine-Westphalia, Germany
Hasenbach, a division of Neunkirchen-Seelscheid, a municipality of  North Rhine-Westphalia, Germany